The Norse Federation is a Norwegian non-profit organization that was founded in 1907, and is under the patronage of the monarch of Norway, currently King Harald V. The organization states that its purpose is to "unit[e] friends of Norway throughout the world". , the organization has approximately 3500 members. It publishes a periodical which is named The Norseman. The federation merged with the Norway-America Association (NORAM) in 2020.

Structure

General secretaries
 Thoralv Klaveness (1908–1910)
 Carl Joachim Hambro (1910–1914)
 Wilhelm Morgenstierne (1914–1917)
 Simon Christian Hammer (1917–1920)
 Sigurd Folkestad (1920–1925)
 Arne Kildal (1925–1941 (WWII) and 1945 to 1955) *
 Edvard Hambro (USA) (1941–1945)
 Johan Hambro (1955–1983)
 Johan Fredrik Heyerdahl (1983–2000)
 Gunnar Gran (2000–2001)
 Kjetil A. Flatin (2001–2004)
 George A. Broch (2004–2008)
 Lasse Espelid (2008–2012)
 Hanne Aaberg (2012–present)

Presidents
 Carl Christian Berner (1906–1915)
 Fredrik Georg Gade (1915–1924)
 Carl Joachim Hambro (1924–1941 (WWII) and 1945 to 1946) *
 Didrik Arup Seip (1946–1954)
 Jacob S. Worm-Müller (1954–1960)
 Aksel Kvam (1960–1963)
 Thorolf Kandahl (1963–1974)
 Paul Thyness (1974–1980)
 Wilhelm Mohr (1980–1988)
 Inge Lønning (1988–1998)
 Kjetil A. Flatin (1998–2001)
 Lucy Smith (2001–2005)
 Hallgrim Berg (2005–2012)
 Tom Vraalsen (2005–2008)
 Erik Giercksky (2012–2014)
 Inger Prebensen (2014–present)

References

External links

1907 establishments in Norway
Norwegian-American culture